Frankfort Senior High School is a public secondary school in Frankfort, Indiana, United States. It serves grades 9-12 for the Community Schools of Frankfort.

Demographics
The demographic breakdown of the 904 students enrolled for the 2018–19 school year was:
Male - 50.7%
Female - 49.3%
Black - 1.0%
Hispanic - 50.9%
White - 46.5%
Multiracial - 1.6%
100% of the students were eligible for free or reduced-cost lunch. For 2018–19, Frankfort was a Title I school.

Athletics
Frankfort's Hot Dogs compete in the Sagamore Conference. School colors are blue and white. The following Indiana High School Athletic Association (IHSAA) sanctioned sports are offered:

Baseball (boys) 
Basketball (girls and boys) 
Boys state champion - 1925, 1929, 1936, 1939
Cross country (girls and boys) 
Football (boys) 
Golf (girls and boys) 
Soccer (girls and boys) 
Softball (girls) 
Swimming and diving (girls and boys) 
Tennis (girls and boys) 
Track and field (girls and boys) 
Volleyball (girls) 
Wrestling (boys)

Notable alumni
 Dan Flanagan: Justice of the Indiana Supreme Court
 Ted Hazelwood: played offensive tackle for the Purdue Boilermakers and the North Carolina Tar Heels. He was drafted in the 16th round of the 1946 NFL Draft by the Chicago Bears and also played for the Washington Redskins

See also

 List of high schools in Indiana
 Education in the United States

References

External links

School district website

Public high schools in Indiana
Buildings and structures in Clinton County, Indiana